"Fracture" is a song by Australian band Slumberjack, featuring female folk/indie-pop vocalist Vera Blue. The song was released on 13 January 2017 and peaked at number 89 on the ARIA Chart.

Reception
Tom Williams from Music Feeds said the song mixes "eastern melodies with some heavy-as-hell drum kicks, as Pavey’s vocals glide over the top." Sosefina Fuamoli of The AU Review said Blue's vocals had "an icy edge" while also stating "onward pushing electro beats pulsate deeply". Joseph Smith of Stoney Roads stated "Vera Blue's vocal range is simply phenomenal, and she flaunts this effortlessly on top of Slumberjack’s hard-hitting, synth-heavy production that acts as a brilliant foundation." Farrell Sweeney of Dancing Astronaut said the track was "heavy enough to appeal to future bass lovers along with progressive house/pop lovers".

Charts

References 

Vera Blue songs
2017 singles
2016 songs